Claudio Emmanuel Villalba (born 22 August 1982) is an Argentine professional footballer who plays as a defender.

Career
Between 2004 and 2006, Villalba played for Textil Mandiyú of Torneo Argentino B and Candelaria of Torneo Argentino A and made a total of thirty-three appearances and scored two goals. In 2009, Villalba began featuring for Primera B Metropolitana side Temperley. Having featured in five matches, the defender left to join fellow third tier team Deportivo Armenio. He remained for three campaigns, culminating with seventeen games in 2012–13 as they placed eighth. After another spell in Primera B Metropolitana with Comunicaciones, Villalba had stints with Justo José de Urquiza and Juventud Unida Universitario.

Villalba spent time with Cañuelas and San Jorge in early 2016, prior to agreeing terms with Tristán Suárez later that year on 30 June. He made his debut for them on 7 September versus Deportivo Español, on the way to seventeen appearances in the 2016–17 Primera B Metropolitana. August 2017 saw Villalba move to Primera C Metropolitana with Defensores Unidos. They won the league title - and subsequent promotion - in his first season. He left in June 2019.

Career statistics
.

Honours
Defensores Unidos
Primera C Metropolitana: 2017–18

References

External links

1982 births
Living people
Footballers from Buenos Aires
Argentine footballers
Association football defenders
Torneo Argentino B players
Torneo Argentino A players
Primera B Metropolitana players
Primera C Metropolitana players
Textil Mandiyú footballers
Club Atlético Temperley footballers
Deportivo Armenio footballers
Club Comunicaciones footballers
Asociación Social y Deportiva Justo José de Urquiza players
Juventud Unida Universitario players
Cañuelas footballers
CSyD Tristán Suárez footballers
Defensores Unidos footballers